The Best of Sammy Hagar is a Sammy Hagar compilation album.

Song information 
This compilation marks the first CD release of Sammy's 1979 cover of Otis Redding's "(Sittin' On) The Dock of the Bay". That recording was released as a single and not included on Sammy's 1980 follow up album Danger Zone. Producer John Carter had the track recorded in May 1979 with guitarist Steve Cropper, bassist Leland Sklar, and drummer Alvin Taylor. Later, he added Sammy's vocals with background harmonies by three then-members of Boston, with whom Sammy had just toured.

Track listing 
 "Red" (John Carter/Sammy Hagar) - 4:57 (from the January 1977-released Sammy Hagar album)
 "(Sittin' On) The Dock of the Bay" (Steve Cropper/Otis Redding) - 3:02 (released as a 1979 non-album single)
 "I've Done Everything for You" (Sammy Hagar) - 3:25 (first appeared on the 1982 Rematch album)
 "Rock 'N' Roll Weekend" (Sammy Hagar) - 3:43 (from Sammy Hagar)
 "Cruisin' & Boozin'" (Sammy Hagar) - 3:07 (from Sammy Hagar)
 "Turn Up the Music" (John Carter/Sammy Hagar) - 5:46 (from the October 1977-released Musical Chairs album)
 "Reckless" (Sammy Hagar) - 3:34 (from Musical Chairs)
 "Trans Am (Highway Wonderland)" (Sammy Hagar) - 3:31 (from the 1979 Street Machine album)
 "Love or Money" (Sammy Hagar) - 3:57 (from the 1980 Danger Zone album)
 "This Planet's on Fire (Burn in Hell)" (Sammy Hagar) - 4:36 (from Street Machine)
 "Plain Jane" (Sammy Hagar) - 3:48 (from Street Machine)
 "Bad Reputation" (Sammy Hagar) - 3:32 (from Danger Zone)
 "Bad Motor Scooter" (Sammy Hagar) - 7:07 (from the 1978 All Night Long live album)
 "You Make Me Crazy" (Sammy Hagar) - 2:45 (from Musical Chairs)

External links 
Lyrics from Sammy's official site. link
 www.redrockerdiscography.com

References 

Sammy Hagar albums
1992 compilation albums